Morgan's Wonderland is an accessibility-focused theme park in San Antonio, Texas founded in 2010. The park was developed by Gordon Hartman, a former homebuilder from San Antonio. Morgan's Wonderland has had over a net million guests since its opening in 2010. The park features several attractions including rides, playgrounds, gardens, a catch-and-release fishing lake, a special-event center, and 575-seat amphitheater. The park's focus on accessibility makes it free for disabled individuals to attend the park.

History

In 2005, Hartman sold his homebuilding business to establish The Gordon Hartman Family Foundation so he and his wife, Maggie, could aid children and adults with special needs. During a family vacation, Morgan wanted to play with kids tossing a ball in a hotel swimming pool, but when she approached them, they abruptly took their ball and vanished. “I’ll never forget the look of anguish and dismay on Morgan’s face, so I decided there had to be a way to bridge the gap of misunderstanding about people with special needs. That incident was the tipping point for Morgan’s Wonderland and ultimately Morgan’s Inspiration Island,” Hartman said.

On March 3, 2010, Morgan's Wonderland opened, with NBA legend David Robinson and actress Eva Longoria as special guests.

Starting in 2012, Toyota partnered with the park as a long-term sponsor.

On June 17, 2017, Morgan's Wonderland unveiled a major addition: the Morgan's Inspiration Island splash park.

In 2020 the park closed after only 11 days into the season due to the COVID-19 pandemic. The park reopened for the 2021 season at limited capacity.

In 2022 the park hosted the Special Olympics Texas Summer Games.

Events 
The park holds a Snowball Run annually in December, which involves both 5K and 1K walking/running events. The events are open to all ages and abilities.

Related complexes

Morgan's Inspiration Island 
On June 17, 2017, Morgan's Wonderland unveiled the Morgan's Inspiration Island splash park. The park features waterproof wheelchairs that guests can use. Some parts of the park use warm water, to be accessible to visitors with certain muscular conditions.

Morgan's Wonderland Sports Complex 
In 2021 the park opened the Morgan's Wonderland Sports Complex, which includes wheelchair-accessible baseball/softball and football fields, and basketball, pickleball, tennis, and volleyball courts.

Morgan's Wonderland Camp 
In summer 2022 the park opened Morgan's Wonderland Camp, an accessible camping program that can serve about 500 campers of any ability. The San Antonio Food Bank uses the camp's kitchen year-round.

Multi-Assistance Center 
The Multi-Assistance Center (MAC), which provides medical services to disabled individuals, opened on October 2, 2022. As of its opening, services provided included therapeutic care, dental care, and same day surgery.

Awards and recognition 
Morgan's Wonderland and Morgan's Inspiration Island have been acclaimed for their emphases on inclusion and accessible design.

See also

References

Accessibility
2010 establishments in Texas
Tourist attractions in San Antonio
Amusement parks in Texas
Water parks in Texas
Buildings and structures in San Antonio